Joel Pearce Heyman (born September 16, 1971) is an American actor, best known for voicing Michael J. Caboose in the Rooster Teeth web series Red vs. Blue from 2003 until 2020. He co-founded Rooster Teeth with Burnie Burns, Matt Hullum, Geoff Ramsey and Gus Sorola and has appeared in their other projects, including The Strangerhood (2004–2006, 2015), The Gauntlet (2012) and RWBY (2013–2020).

Career
Heyman's credited roles include Private Michael J. Caboose and O'Malley in the popular Rooster Teeth web series Red vs. Blue, Wade in The Strangerhood and Bartholomew Oobleck in RWBY. In addition to his involvement in machinima, he starred in The Schedule, a live-action film written and directed by Burnie Burns, the creator of Red vs. Blue, and has also appeared on shows such as Friends, Angel, The Inside and Alias. He has reprised his Red vs. Blue role as a Blue Prison Guard in the G4 show Code Monkeys and had a minor role in Halo 3 as a UNSC Marine. He was also a recurring member of The Rooster Teeth Podcast (previously The Drunk Tank) and hosted a series of Rooster Teeth gaming videos called How To, where he and fellow employee Adam Ellis play various video games while under the effects of alcohol. He had a cameo role in the film Lazer Team, playing a news reporter.

On June 1, 2020, Joel replied to a user on Twitter that he had been "laid off" by Rooster Teeth for personal reasons with the company.

Personal life
Heyman is a graduate of the University of Texas at Austin, where he received a Bachelor of Fine Arts degree in drama production. He has recently moved back to Los Angeles, California, where he lived during the first season of Red vs. Blue.

Filmography

Film

Television

Web

Video games

References

External links

 

1971 births
American male voice actors
American male web series actors
21st-century American male actors
American animated film producers
Living people
Place of birth missing (living people)
Male actors from Austin, Texas
Rooster Teeth people
Moody College of Communication alumni
Screenwriters from Texas
21st-century American screenwriters
Texas Democrats